The Florida Department of Education (FLDOE) is the state education agency of Florida. It governs public education and manages funding and testing for local educational agencies (school boards). It is headquartered in the Turlington Building (named for former education commissioner Ralph Turlington) in Tallahassee.

The Florida commissioner of education manages the day-to-day operation of the department. The office of education commissioner was originally a Cabinet-level position filled by direct election and directly responsible for education in Florida. The 2002 Florida Constitution Revision Commission submitted a revision to the Florida Constitution, amending Article IV, Section IV to reduce the Cabinet from six elected officials to three. The voters approved the changes and it became effective January 7, 2003; after this time, the commissioner of education became an appointed position and the FLDOE became the overall responsibility of the governor. The revised constitution also created a new Florida Board of Education with seven members (one of whom is the commissioner of education), appointed by the governor to oversee the Department of Education.
Division of Vocational Rehabilitation - 930 positions 
Division of Blind Services - 300 positions 
Annual operating budget for all entities in 2012-13 - approximately $18.6 billion 
Oversee 28 locally governed public state colleges and 47 school district technical centers

The department supports 2.6 million students, 3,800 public schools and 318,000 full-time staff and more than 180,000 teachers.

The department manages the Florida Information Resource Network (FIRN), which provides Internet access to public schools.

History
The superintendent of public instruction was established to oversee Florida's public schools in the 1868 Florida Constitution. The elected officeholder became the commissioner of education under the 1968 Florida Constitution. A constitutional amendment in 1998 made effective January 2003 reorganized the office so its head was no longer elected and created a  State Board of Education.

In 2022, the Florida Department of Education rejected a record 41% of mathematics textbooks for non-compliance with the state's new B.E.S.T. Standards, which replace Common Core. The department claimed that the books rejected "incorporate prohibited topics or unsolicited strategies", including critical race theory (CRT), social–emotional learning (SEL), and Common Core. Commissioner of Education Richard Corcoran stated that the state is aiming to prevent "indoctrination or exposure to dangerous and divisive concepts in our classrooms". The state did not provide any specific examples of content that led to the books being rejected. The state later approved 19 previously-rejected books, after receiving assurances from publishers that "woke content" had been removed.

In May 2022, the state published records disclosing the results of the reviews, revealing that the majority of reviewers—largely educators—found no evidence of the textbooks containing CRT, but more often flagged for containing SEL. Most of the accusations of prohibited content came from Chris Allen—a vice chair of a chapter of the conservative group Moms for Liberty—who accused textbooks of promoting CRT because of its inclusion of data surrounding an implicit bias test and a statement that the United States had not "eradicated poverty or racism", complained of a word problem that involved the gender pay gap, objected to an author "[talking] about a climate crisis as if it’s a proven fact". and objected to questions involving elections and vaccines that did not include references to The Federalist Papers or natural immunity.

State exams
The State of Florida requires students to take the Florida Standards Assessments (FSA) each year in grades 3-10. Students' results from the FSA are compiled to generate a grade for each public school under former governor Jeb Bush's "A+ Plan." Under this plan, public schools receive a letter grade from A to F, depending on student performance and the degree to which the bottom 25% of the school has improved compared to its past performances. The higher a public school scores, the more funding it receives.

Teacher certification
The department paid bonuses to teachers certified by the federal government. Up until 2010, the bonus was as much as $3,800 annually. This is expected to diminish with diminished income to the state.

Superintendents of Public Instruction
C. Thurston Chase (1868–1870)
Henry Quarles (1870–1871)
Rev. Charles Beecher (1871–1873)
Jonathan C. Gibbs (1873–1874)
William Watkin Hicks (1875–1876)
William Penn Haisley (1877–1881)
Eleazer K. Foster (1881–1884)
Albert Jonathan Russell (1884–1893)
William N. Sheats (1893–1905) and (1913–1922)
William M. Holloway (1905–1913)
William S. Cawthon (1922–1937)
Colin English (1937–1949)
Thomas D. Bailey (1949–1965)
T. D. Johnson (1965)
Floyd Thomas Christian (Supt. of Public Instruction 1965–1969; Commissioner of Education in 1969–1974)

Commissioners of Education
Ralph D. Turlington (1974–1986)
Betty Castor (1986–1994)
Douglas L. Jamerson (1994–1995)
Frank T. Brogan (1995–1999)
Tom Gallagher (1999–2001)
Charlie Crist (2001–2003)
Jim Horne (2003–2004)
John L. Winn (2004–2007)
Jeanine Blomberg (interim) (2007)
Eric J. Smith (October 5, 2007 – June 10, 2011)
Gerard Robinson (June 11, 2011 – 2012)
Tony Bennett (January – August 2013)
Pam Stewart (August 2013 – January 8, 2019)
Richard Corcoran (January 8, 2019 – May 1, 2022)
Jacob Oliva (interim) (May 1, 2022 – June 1, 2022)
Manny Díaz Jr. (June 1, 2022 – present)

See also

Education in Florida
FEAP
Florida College System
Florida Board of Governors
State University System of Florida
Florida Comprehensive Assessment Test
List of colleges and universities in Florida

References

External links
Florida Department of Education website
Florida Department of Education Statistics and Schools

Department of Education
State departments of education of the United States
State agencies of Florida
1870 establishments in Florida